The 2015 Tilia Slovenia Open was a professional tennis tournament played on hard courts. It was the third edition of the tournament which was part of the 2015 ATP Challenger Tour. It took place in Portorož, Slovenia between 10 – 15 August 2015.

Singles main-draw entrants

Seeds

 1 Rankings are as of August 3, 2015.

Other entrants
The following players received wildcards into the singles main draw:

  Cem İlkel
  Aljaž Jakob Kaplja
  Aljaž Radinski
  Grega Žemlja

The following player entered the singles main draw as an alternate:
  David Guez

The following players received entry from the qualifying draw:
  Riccardo Ghedin
  Cristian Garín
  Joshua Milton
  Edoardo Eremin

The following player entered the singles main draw as a lucky looser:
  Jonathan Eysseric

Champions

Singles

 Luca Vanni d.  Grega Žemlja 6–3, 7–6(8–6)

Doubles

 Fabrice Martin /  Purav Raja d.  Aliaksandr Bury /  Andreas Siljeström 7–6(7–5), 4–6, [18–16]

External links
Official Website

Tilia Slovenia Open
Tilia Slovenia Open
2015 in Slovenian tennis